William S. Abrahams was an American book editor, author and the editor of the O. Henry Award from 1967 to 1996.

Background 
Abrahams became a book editor in 1963, when he got a part-time job reading manuscripts for Atlantic Monthly Press. In total, he edited more than 350 books at Atlantic Monthly Press and also with Holt, Reinhart & Winston and Dutton.

Some of his early poems appeared in literary magazines and were included in anthologies. He published a number of novels on his own, and a number of works together with historian Peter Stansky. He was chosen to assist O. Henry Award editor Richard Poirier from 1961 to 1966 and then became the sole editor from 1966 until 1996.

Published works 
Interval in Carolina (1945)

By the Beautiful Sea (1947)

Imperial Waltz (1954)

The Unknown Orwell (1972 with Stanksy)

Orwell: The Transformation (1980)

London's Burning: Life, Death and Art in the Second World War (1994)

References 

American book editors
20th-century American novelists
20th-century American male writers

20th-century American poets